The Khejarli massacre occurred in September 1730 in Northern India, when 363 Bishnois were killed while trying to peacefully protect a grove of Khejri trees. The soldiers were sent by the Maharaja of Marwar, Abhai Singh to cut the trees in the village of Khejarli to provide wood for a new palace. The killings were carried out on the orders of his minister Giridhar Bhandari. The effort had a long term impact on environmental advocacy, and the massacre later became known as a precursor to the 20th century Chipko movement. Due to the sacrifice of the protesters, the ruler took back his earlier order of felling trees.

History 
In 1726, Abhai Singh of Marwar gained control of the village of Khejarli, also known as Jalnadiya Khejarli, District-Jodhpur। in Rajasthan।. In 1730, he dispatched one of his ministers, Giridhar Bhandari, to collect wood to be used in the construction of a new palace; some sources report that the wood was needed to build the palace, while others note the Marwars intended to burn the trees to create lime. Regardless of intended purpose, Bhandari and his entourage of soldiers arrived in Jehnad, where they demanded access to the village's trees. Led by a woman named Amrita Devi Bishnoi, the villagers refused to surrender their trees to the Raj's soldiers. Amrita stated that the Khejri trees were sacred to the Bishnois, and her faith prohibited her from allowing the trees to be cut down. 

The situation escalated and the Marwan party offered to leave the village's Khejri trees alone in exchange for a bribe. However, this was seen as a grievous insult to the Bishnoi values, and Amrita announced that she would rather die than to allow the trees to be cut down. She and her family began hugging the Khejris, shielding the trees with their bodies. Angered by the rebuke, the Marwans beheaded Amrita and three of her daughters before beginning to cut down the trees. Amrita's last words were recorded as being "A chopped head is cheaper than a chopped tree", and this couplet later became a rallying cry for the Bishnois.

News of the ongoing desecration of Jehnad's trees quickly spread among Rajasthan's Bishnoi population. In all, Bishnois from 83 villages began to travel to Jehnad in an attempt to save the trees, and a council was convened to determine what could be done about the situation. The council's decision was that each Bishnoi volunteer would lay down their life to defend one of the threatened trees. Older people went forward first, with many of them being killed as they hugged the Khejris. Seeing this as an opportunity, Giridhar Bhandari claimed that the Bishnoi were only sending forward people whom they thought were useless to be killed. In response, younger men, women, and children began to hug the trees, resulting in many of them being killed as well. In all, 363 Bishnois were killed while protecting the trees.      

Shocked by the passive resistance of the Bishnois, Abhai Singh recalled his men and personally traveled to the village to apologize for his minister's actions. He decreed that the village would never again be compelled to provide wood for the kingdom. The village was later renamed Khejarli, and the site of the massacre became a place of pilgrimage for the Bishnoi faith.

Legacy 
The Khejarli Massacre was an inspiration for the 20th century environmentalist Chipko movement. Several temples and a cenotaph in Khejarli commemorate the massacre, and the village is the site of an annual Bishnoi ceremony held in honor of the event.  A fair is organized every year on Shukla Dashmi of Bhadrapad (Hindu month) in September at Khejarli, Jodhpur, to pay homage to the great martyrs of environment protection.

The Government of India has also instituted the Amrita Devi Bishnoi Environment Protection Award recognizing the sacrifice of Amrita Devi. In 2013, the Ministry of Environment declared the day of the massacre (11 September) as National Forest Martyr's Day.

References 

Massacres in India
Environmental protests
History of Rajasthan